Larenguan Township (Mandarin: 拉仁关乡) is a township in Luqu County, Gannan Tibetan Autonomous Prefecture, Gansu, China. In 2010, Larenguan Township had a total population of 2,870: 1,412 males and 1,458 females: 783 aged under 14, 1,874 aged between 15 and 65 and 213 aged over 65.

References 

Township-level divisions of Gansu
Gannan Tibetan Autonomous Prefecture